Michael Robert Belfield (born 10 June 1961) in Wandsworth, London, England, is an English retired professional footballer and a football manager who is currently working as a youth coach in Finnish club RiPS.

He played as a winger for Wimbledon in the Football League and had a long career in Finland. Belfield played 16 seasons and 355 caps in the Finnish premier divisions Mestaruussarja and Veikkausliiga for Koparit, FC Ilves, Reipas Lahti, FC Kuusysi, FC Haka and PK-35 from 1981 to 1995 and 1998. Whilst at Kuusysi he memorably scored the only goal as they beat Liverpool in a 1991–92 UEFA Cup tie, however despite winning 1-0 on the night Kuusysi lost 6-2 on aggregate. After his professional career Belfield has been coaching several Finnish clubs.

Honours 
Finnish championship: 1983, 1991, 1995

References

1961 births
Living people
Footballers from Wandsworth
English footballers
Association football forwards
English Football League players
English expatriate footballers
Expatriate footballers in Finland
Veikkausliiga players
Wimbledon F.C. players
Koparit players
FC Ilves players
Reipas Lahti players
FC Kuusysi players
FC Haka players
PK-35 Vantaa (men) players
Tampereen Pallo-Veikot players
HIFK players
Hyvinkään Palloseura players
Atlantis FC players